Musiraz (also Romanized as Mūsīraz; also known as Mūsīr) is a village in Zibad Rural District, Kakhk District, Gonabad County, Razavi Khorasan Province, Iran. At the 2006 census, its population was 217, in 84 families.

References 

Populated places in Gonabad County